Broșteni is a commune located in Vrancea County, Muntenia, Romania. It is composed of three villages: Arva, Broșteni and Pitulușa.

References

Communes in Vrancea County
Localities in Muntenia